Buckminster Fuller (Richard Buckminster Fuller, 1895–1983) was an American architect, systems theorist, author, designer, inventor, and futurist.

Buckminster Fuller may also refer to:

 Buckminster Fuller (EP), by Nerina Pallot, 2009 
 Arthur Buckminster Fuller (1822–1862), a Unitarian clergyman of the U.S.
 Buckminster Fuller Challenge, an annual international design competition

See also

Geodesic dome, a hemispherical thin-shell structure, popularised by Buckminster Fuller
Buckminsterfullerene, is a type of fullerene with formula C60
R. Buckminster Fuller and Anne Hewlett Dome Home, in Carbondale, Illinois, U.S.
:Category:Buckminster Fuller

Buckminster Fuller